Tangaroa College is a state coeducational secondary school catering for years 9–13 in Otara, Auckland, New Zealand.

Scholarships
On a yearly basis Tangaroa College receives 20 exclusive scholarships from the Manukau Institute of Technology.

Facilities
Tangaroa College has many divisions, referred to as blocks. These blocks are;
T-Block for technology
W-Block for Māori
E-Block for Social Sciences Studies 
C-Block for Art and Computing
B-Block for English
G-Block for PE and Health
H-Block for Services Academy
NRR for Drama and Employment Studies
as well as
D-Block for Science and Mathematics

Demographics
Last visited by Education Review Office (ERO) on 28 November 2016. The next review is due in three years (2019).

ERO found that a significant feature of Tangaroa College is the provision of three academies that enhance students' outcomes and opportunities for future pathways as well as Teen Parent Unit and Alternative Education Centre.

Tangaroa College had 857 students enrolled. Fifty-one percent of students were male and 49% were female. Of them, 39% identified themselves as Samoans, 17% of students identified as Cook Islanders, 2% as Asian, 18% identified as Māori, 15% Tongan, 5% as Niue, and 2% as another ethnicity.

Alumni
Notable alumni include
New Zealand Politician Efeso Collins.
Widnes Vikings and Kiwis halfback Aaron Heremaia
Actor Beulah Koale
Counties Manukau rugby player Fritz Lee
Vodafone Warriors and Toa Samoa prop Sam Lisone
Former All Blacks and Rugby Sevens player Eric Rush.
Brave Blossom and Blues centre Male Sa'u
South Sydney Rabbitohs and Newcastle Knights league player David Fa'alogo

Notable staff
Current
Author David Riley currently teaches at Tangaroa College. Riley has written books on Pacific Island heroes and New Zealand sports personalities such as; Benji Marshall and Sonny Bill Williams.
Former Black Fern Davida White is a current principal.
Current Waikato Chiefs lock, Matiaha Martin is the Head for the Māori department.

Former
Renowned New Zealand and Pacific Island artist, Ioane Ioane.
Political Activist, John Minto.
Former student and staff member, Bryan "Marshy" Marsh, was once the roving reporter for the Vodafone Warriors.
Former Black Fern Annaleah Rush
Danielle Tungane Cochrane, later Minister of Education for the Cook Islands
Black Fern Te Kura Ngata-Aerengamate taught the Maori language and P.E.

References

Educational institutions established in 1976
Secondary schools in Auckland
New Zealand secondary schools of S68 plan construction
1976 establishments in New Zealand
Ōtara-Papatoetoe Local Board Area